Events from the year 1794 in Ireland.

Incumbent
Monarch: George III

Events
1 January – Lagan Canal opened throughout from Belfast to Lough Neagh.
4 May – Dublin Society of United Irishmen suppressed.
29 June – physician and poet William Drennan, a leading figure in the Dublin Society of United Irishmen, is tried for seditious libel for circulating a pamphlet Address to the Volunteers in 1792; he is acquitted but withdraws from further direct political commitment.
November – Richard Lovell Edgeworth demonstrates a semaphore line from Donaghadee across the Irish Sea to Portpatrick in Scotland.
Establishment of Ballincollig Gunpowder Mills.
Mary Leadbeater publishes Extracts and Original Anecdotes for the Improvement of Youth anonymously in Dublin.

Births
9 January – Mother Frances Mary Teresa Ball, founder of Irish Branch of the Institute of the Blessed Virgin Mary and Loreto schools (died 1861).
4 March – William Carleton, writer (died 1869).
23 April – Benjamin Holmes, businessman and politician in Quebec (died 1865).
6 May – Price Blackwood, 4th Baron Dufferin and Claneboye, Royal Navy captain (died 1841).
17 May – Anna Brownell Jameson, writer (died 1860).
10 July – William Maginn, journalist and writer (died 1842).
18 July – Feargus O'Connor, political radical and Chartist leader (died 1855 in England)
20 November – Eugene O'Curry, scholar (died 1862).
Full date unknown
Joseph Patrick Haverty, painter (died 1864).
Sir Alexander Macdonnell, 1st Baronet, lawyer, civil servant and commissioner of national education in Ireland (died 1875).

Deaths
7 June – John Browne, 1st Baron Kilmaine, politician (born 1726).
Full date unknown
Richard Robinson, 1st Baron Rokeby, Archbishop of Armagh and founder of the Armagh Observatory (born 1709).

References

 
Years of the 18th century in Ireland
Ireland
1790s in Ireland